Dr. Sándor Keresztes (9 March 1919 – 14 August 2013) was a Hungarian diplomat and jurist, who served as president of the Christian Democratic People's Party (1989–1990) and Member of Parliament (1947–1948, 1990, 1994–1998).

References

1919 births
2013 deaths
People from Cluj County
Christian Democratic People's Party (Hungary) politicians
Members of the National Assembly of Hungary (1947–1949)
Members of the National Assembly of Hungary (1990–1994)
Members of the National Assembly of Hungary (1994–1998)
Hungarian diplomats